WDCG (105.1 FM) is a commercial Top 40 (CHR) station licensed to Durham, North Carolina and serving the Raleigh-Durham radio market. Its studios are located on Smoketree Court in Raleigh's Highwoods Office Park and owned by iHeartMedia, along with WNCB, W237BZ, WRDU, and WTKK. The transmitter site for the station is in Apex.

WDCG broadcasts in the HD Radio format.

History
WDCG first began as a radio station on February 29, 1948 as WDNC-FM 105.1, a sister station to WDNC; both were owned by Durham Morning Herald and The Durham Sun.  The sign-on of the 36,000-watt FM station coincided with the AM station's power increase and frequency shift from 1490 to 620 kilohertz.  In 1953, the Herald-Sun group joined WTIK owners Floyd Fletcher and Harmon Duncan in securing a license to operate a television station in Durham, which would eventually become WTVD Channel 11 the following year.  Until the mid-1970s, WDNC-FM simulcast the AM programming from an antenna located atop one of AM 620's three towers on Shocoree Drive in western Durham just off Interstate 85. (The old 105.1 FM antenna was visible on the easternmost tower until the site was razed in late 2017.)

In 1974, WDNC-FM became a country station and changed its calls to WDCG-FM (Durham's Country Giant). The station later switched to rock music in the late 1970s before becoming a Top 40 station in Fall 1981. A year later, the station boosted their power to 100,000 watts and moved to the former WRDU-TV (now WRDC) tower at Terrell's Mountain in northern Chatham County. This allowed WDCG-FM to put a city grade into Raleigh, Durham and Chapel Hill, as well as a 60 dbu signal into Greensboro-High Point-Winston-Salem, where the station even beat the local Top 40s from 60 miles away. WDCG, licensed to Durham, was the first station in the Raleigh-Durham market to obtain a dual city of license in terms of their station identification in 1982, and surprised the stations in Raleigh with its designation of "WDCG-Durham, Raleigh, Chapel Hill."

With no promotional dollars and against the powerhouses of WRAL-FM and WQDR-FM, WDCG grew every six months in Arbitron starting in the Fall of 1981 with a 1.8 - 4.5 - 9.0 - 9.8 - 11.1 - 14.5 by the Spring of 1984.

WDCG was operated as a loss leader for years by the Durham Herald-Sun, as the owners felt eventually newspapers would be viewed on a computer screen - and they had the distribution system via WDCG's FM sub-carrier that the Raleigh News and Observer did not have. The Durham Herald-Sun had never separated the financial books of WDCG and WDNC. The combined stations had only been profitable in 2 of the 10 years prior to 1983 - with a $10,000 profit one year and a $59,000 profit in 1979. By 1984, WDCG alone was billing just under 4 million dollars (inflation-adjusted about $16,000,000 today). Over $60,000 a month was coming in from the Greensboro-High Point market, 60 miles away, where WDCG had a dedicated salesperson.

WDCG operated from the Herald-Sun building in Downtown Durham from its 1948 sign-on until 1992, when the station, along with WDNC, moved to more spacious studios at Park Forty Plaza in southern Durham near Research Triangle Park as the owners saw their loss leader turn into a cash cow. The new facilities included state-of-the-art computer-integration, including software-controlled transmitters and audio playback from hard disk.

In 1993, the Herald-Sun sold WDCG to Prizm Broadcasting, which had also purchased Vilcom's WZZU 93.9 (now WNCB). After following four different ownership changes, WDCG and its sister stations later moved into Raleigh's Smoketree Tower, now called the Highwoods Building, and are now owned by Clear Channel Worldwide.

In 2004, the station's FM class was slightly downgraded from a class "C" to a class "C-0", allowing WZBL, a Clear Channel station in Roanoke, Virginia, to make an upgrade to its signal. No changes were necessary to WDCG's actual facilities in the short term. In March 2005, the FCC approved the station's moving their antenna from Terrell's Mountain to the former WLFL-TV analog tower in Apex in an effort to provide better, more centralized coverage of the market. The change involved a drop in power from 100,000 watts to 73,000 watts and another downgrade in class, this time to a class "C-1". On March 13, 2008, WDCG began broadcasting from the Apex site. The move actually increased the covered population inside the station's coverage by more than 500,000 persons, improved building penetration and placed the station as the second best signal in the market, just behind its sister station WNCB.

HD Radio
On November 16, 2012, an alternative format, marketed as "95X" debuted on WDCG-HD2, which is simulcast on translator station W237BZ (95.3 MHz) in Clayton, North Carolina. A second translator, W236CA (95.1 MHz) in Durham, North Carolina, began simulcasting in late 2015. On January 9, 2018, 95X rebranded as “Alt 95.3”. On November 11, 2021, at 10 a.m., WDCG-HD2/W236CA/W237BZ dropped the alternative format and began stunting with Christmas music as "Christmas 95.3." On December 26, at 12:00 a.m., the station flipped to classic hip hop, branded as "95.3 The Beat". The first song on "The Beat" was "Party Up (Up in Here)" by DMX.

Notable past on-air staff
Rick Freeman
Mike Edwards

Former programming
WDCG is an affiliate of The Rockin' America Top 30 Countdown with Scott Shannon in the 1980s.

References

External links
Official website

DCG
Contemporary hit radio stations in the United States
Radio stations established in 1948
IHeartMedia radio stations
1948 establishments in North Carolina